Strongarm may refer to:

 StrongARM,  a RISC microprocessor created by Digital Equipment Corporation
 Strongarm (band), a hardcore band from Florida
 Strongarm, a beer produced in England since 1955 by Camerons Brewery
 Strongarm (Masters of the Universe), a fictional character from the Masters of the Universe franchise
 Strongarm (Transformers), several fictional characters from the Transformers robot superhero franchise (both male and female).